Pinchem, Kentucky may refer to two unincorporated communities:

Pinchem, Clark County, Kentucky
Pinchem, Todd County, Kentucky